Events from the year 1702 in Russia

Incumbents
 Monarch – Peter I

Events

 Zlynka

Births

Deaths

References

 
Years of the 18th century in Russia